Cobitis megaspila is a species of ray-finned fish in the family Cobitidae.
It is found in Moldova and Romania.

Taxonomic note 
This species is now considered to be a jr. synonym of Cobitis elongatoides.

References 
 World Conservation Monitoring Centre 1996. Cobitis megaspila. 2006 IUCN Red List of Threatened Species. Downloaded on 19 July 2007.

Cobitis
Taxa named by Teodor T. Nalbant
Fish described in 1993
Taxonomy articles created by Polbot